World Class Championship Wrestling (WCCW), based out of Dallas, Texas held a number of major professional wrestling super shows under the name Wrestling Star Wars'' between 1981 and 1989, with three of these being held in 1983. Promoter Fritz Von Erich held five "Wrestling Star Wars" events, one in March, one in August as well as a special Star Wars show for Independence Day, Thanksgiving and Christmas.

Wrestling Star Wars (June)Wrestling Star Wars (June 1983) was a professional wrestling supercard show that was held on June 17, 1983. The show was produced and scripted by the Dallas, Texas-based World Class Championship Wrestling (WCCW) professional wrestling promotion and held in their home area, the Dallas, Texas. Several matches from the show were taped for WCCW's television shows and broadcast in the weeks following the show. The show was the seventh overall show in the "Wrestling Star Wars" event chronology. The show, held at the Reunion Arena, drew 21,000 spectators, announced as a full sellout.

Results

Independence Day Star WarsIndependence Day Star Wars (1983) was a professional wrestling supercard show that was held on July 4, 1983. The show was produced and scripted by the Dallas, Texas-based World Class Championship Wrestling (WCCW) professional wrestling promotion and held in their home area, Dallas/Ft. Worth, Texas. Several matches from the show were taped for WCCW's television shows and broadcast in the weeks following the show. The show was the eighth overall show in the "Wrestling Star Wars" event chronology. The show, held at the Fort Worth Convention Center, drew 12,000 spectators out if its estimated 18,000 seat capacity when configured for professional wrestling shows.

Results

Labor Day Star WarsLabor Day Star Wars (1983) was a professional wrestling supercard show that was held on September 5, 1983. The show was produced and scripted by the Dallas, Texas-based World Class Championship Wrestling (WCCW) professional wrestling promotion and held in their home area, Dallas/Ft. Worth, Texas. Several matches from the show were taped for WCCW's television shows and broadcast in the weeks following the show. The show was the ninth overall show in the "Wrestling Star Wars" event chronology. The show, held at the Fort Worth Convention Center, drew 11,573 spectators out if its estimated 18,000 seat capacity when configured for professional wrestling shows.

Results

Thanksgiving Star WarsThanksgiving Star Wars (1983) was a professional wrestling supercard show that was held on November 24, 1983. The show was produced and scripted by the Dallas, Texas-based World Class Championship Wrestling (WCCW) professional wrestling promotion and held in their home area, Dallas, Texas. Several matches from the show were taped for WCCW's television shows and broadcast in the weeks following the show. The show was the tenth overall show in the "Wrestling Star Wars" event chronology. The show, held at the Reunion Arena, drew 18,500 spectators out of its approximately 21,000 seat capacity.

Results

Christmas Star WarsChristmas Star Wars (1983)''' was a professional wrestling supercard show that was held on December 25, 1983. The show was produced and scripted by the Dallas, Texas-based World Class Championship Wrestling (WCCW) professional wrestling promotion and held in their home area, Dallas, Texas. Several matches from the show were taped for WCCW's television shows and broadcast in the weeks following the show. The show was the 11th overall show in the "Wrestling Star Wars" event chronology. The show, held at the Reunion Arena, drew 19,675 spectators out of its approximately 21,000 seat capacity.

Results

References

1983 in professional wrestling
World Class Championship Wrestling shows